Saloo George is an Indian cinematographer in Malayalam  cinema. Saloo George graduated in cinematography from Adyar Film Institute, Chennai, Tamilnadu.

Career
Saalu George graduated in cinematography from Adyar Film Institute, Chennai, Tamilnadu .

Personal life
Saalu George is married to Rekha George, children Joseph George, Abraham George, Cherian George.

Partial filmography

As cinematographer

Banking Hours 10 to 4 (2012) 
The Filmstaar (2011) 
Aazhakadal (2011)
Sarkar Colony (2011)
Utharaswayamvaram (2009)
Bharya Onnu Makkal Moonnu (2009)
Colours (2009)
Kangaroo (2007)
Kaakki  (2007)
Bada Dosth  (2006)
Kisan (2006)
Kilukkam Kilukilukkam (2006)
Nerariyan CBI (2005)
Ullam (2005)
December (2005)
Pandippada (2005)
Kochi Rajavu (2005)
Sethurama Iyer CBI (2004)
Sasneham Sumithra (2004)
Chathikkatha Chanthu (2004)
C.I.D. Moosa (2003)
Kuberan (2002)
Snehithan (2002)
Kunjikoonan (2002)
Sundara Purushan (2001)
Ee Parakkum Thalika (2001)
The Guard (2001)
Dhosth (2014)
Nagaravadhu (2001)
Mimics 2000 (2000)
Thenkasipattanam (2000)
Sathyameva Jayathe (2001)
Daivathinte Makan (2000)
Mark Antony (2000)
Thachiledathu Chundan (1999)
Aalibabayum Aarara Kallanmarum (1998)
Achaammakkuttiyude Achaayan (1998)
Janathipathyam (1997)
Masmaram (1997)
Aayiram Naavulla Ananthan (1996)
Manthrika Kuthira (1996)
Swarna Kireedam (1996)
Maanthrikam (1995)
Mangalyasootram (1995)
Kusruthikaatu (1995)
Bharya (1994)
Pradakshinam (1994)
Kambolam (1994)
Dollar (1994)
Varaphalam (1994) 
Thalamura (1993)
City Police (1997)
Kaazhchakkappuram (1992)
Poochakkaru Mani Kettum (1992)
Champakulam Thachan (1992)
Ennodu Ishtam Koodamo (1992)
Ezhara Ponnana  (1992)
Oru Kochu Bhoomikulukkam  (1992)
Kasarkode Khaderbai (1992)
Aayushkalam (1992)
Cheppukilukkana Changathi (1991)
Ulladakkam (1991)
Mimics Parade (1991)
Vishnulokam (1991)
Sandhwanam (1991)
Nettippattam (1991)
Pavam Pavam Rajakumaran (1990)
Thoovalsparsham (1990)
Saandhram (1990)
Shubhayathra (1990)
Pradeshika Varthakal (1989)
Varnam (1989)
Paadha Mudra (1988)
Thaniyavarthanam (1987)
Ambadi Thannilorunni (1986)
Nulli Novikkathe (1985)
Jalarekha (1981)

References

External links
 

Living people
Year of birth missing (living people)
Cinematographers from Kerala
Film and Television Institute of India alumni
Malayalam film cinematographers
20th-century Indian photographers
21st-century Indian photographers